is project group of Japanese comedian Ken Maeda best known for trance rendition of O-Zone hit Dragostea Din Tei.

Discography

Singles 
  (August 2005)
  (August 2006)

Compilations 
  (July 2004)
  (March 2005)
  (September 2005)
 Buchiage Trance 4 (March 2006)
  (August 2006)

References

External links 
 Official homepage at Victor Music

Japanese pop music groups